The 2014 L'Open Emeraude Solaire de Saint-Malo was a professional tennis tournament played on outdoor clay courts. It was the nineteenth edition of the tournament which was part of the 2014 ITF Women's Circuit, offering a total of $50,000 in prize money. It took place in Saint-Malo, France, on 8–14 September 2014.

Singles main draw entrants

Seeds 

 1 Rankings as of 25 August 2014

Other entrants 
The following players received wildcards into the singles main draw:
  Fanny Caramaro
  Jessika Ponchet
  Jade Suvrijn

The following players received entry from the qualifying draw:
  Catherine Chantraine
  Jasmine Paolini
  Laura Pous Tió
  Sara Sorribes Tormo

The following players received entry by a lucky loser spot:
  Chloé Paquet

The following player received entry by a protected ranking:
  Ana Savić

Champions

Singles 

  Carina Witthöft def.  Alberta Brianti, 6–0, 6–1

Doubles 

  Giulia Gatto-Monticone /  Anastasia Grymalska def.  Tatiana Búa /  Beatriz García Vidagany, 6–3, 6–1

External links 
 2014 L'Open Emeraude Solaire de Saint-Malo at ITFtennis.com
 Official website

2014
2014 ITF Women's Circuit
2014 in French tennis
L'Open 35 de Saint-Malo